"I Wish It Would Rain" is a 1967 song recorded by the Temptations for the Motown label (under the "Gordy" imprint) and produced by Norman Whitfield.

Release 
Issued with the Melvin Franklin-led "I Truly, Truly Believe" as its B-side, "I Wish It Would Rain" peaked for three weeks in February and March 1968 at number four on the Billboard Hot 100 pop singles chart and at the number-one position on the Billboard R&B singles chart.   The single was the focal point of the Temptations' 1968 album The Temptations Wish It Would Rain.

Billboard described the single as an "easy beat blues rocker" that "will soar to the top in short order."  Cash Box said that "touches of Bacarachian style add a refreshingly new dimension to the terrific sound of the Temptations" and that "hard percussion and coasting strings give a solidity and gentleness to the soul vocal."

Personnel
 Lead vocals by David Ruffin
 Background vocals by Eddie Kendricks, Melvin Franklin, Paul Williams, and Otis Williams
 Written by Norman Whitfield, Barrett Strong, and Rodger Penzabene
 Produced by Norman Whitfield
 Instrumentation by The Funk Brothers.

Cover versions 
"I Wish It Would Rain" has been covered by a number of artists, including:
 The Faces recorded a 1973 cover, which was a hit in the United Kingdom.
 Gladys Knight & the Pips, peaking in the US at number 41 pop and 15 R&B.
 Aretha Franklin, on the 1983 album Get It Right.
 New Zealand singer songwriter, Jon Stevens recorded and released a version of the song in 1994, with money raised benefiting drought-stricken farmers. The song peaked at number 49 in New Zealand.
 Bruce Springsteen recorded the song for his 2022 album Only the Strong Survive.

Notes

1967 singles
1968 singles
1973 singles
1994 singles
2007 singles
The Temptations songs
Marvin Gaye songs
Gladys Knight & the Pips songs
Jon Stevens songs
Renée Geyer songs
Ike & Tina Turner songs
Songs written by Barrett Strong
Songs written by Norman Whitfield
Songs written by Rodger Penzabene
Song recordings produced by Norman Whitfield
Gordy Records singles
1967 songs
Songs about loneliness
Songs about infidelity
Songs about heartache
Songs about weather